Kotwar is a village in Sheikhupura District of Punjab in Pakistan.

References

Villages in Sheikhupura District